Klatovy is a town in the Plzeň Region of the Czech Republic. It has about 22,000 inhabitants. The town centre is well preserved and is protected by law as an urban monument zone.

Administrative parts
Klatovy is made up of 30 administrative parts (5 town parts and 25 villages):

Klatovy I
Klatovy II
Klatovy III
Klatovy IV
Klatovy V
Beňovy
Chaloupky
Čínov
Dehtín
Dobrá Voda
Drslavice
Habartice
Kal
Kosmáčov
Křištín
Kvaslice
Kydliny
Lažánky
Luby
Otín
Pihovice
Sobětice
Štěpánovice
Střeziměř
Tajanov
Točník
Tupadly
Věckovice
Vícenice
Vítkovice

Habartice, Kvaslice and Vítkovice, and Dobrá Voda, Křištín and Střeziměř form two exclaves of the municipal territory.

Etymology
According to one theory, the name Klatovy was derived from the personal name Klát, meaning "Klát's (court)". The name Klát has then its origin in the Old Czech word klát, which meant "stump" or "log". According to the second theory, the name Klatovy was derived directly from klát.

Geography

It lies in the Švihov Highlands except for the two exclaves, which lie one in the Blatná Uplands and one in the Bohemian Forest Foothills. A dominant feature of the built-up area is the hill Hůrka (498 m).

The town is situated on the right bank of the Úhlava River. The Drnový Stream, a tributary of the Úhlava, flows through the town.

History

The first written mention of Klatovy is from 1253, when it was a small settlement on a trade route from Bohemia to Bavaria. Between 1260 and 1263, a royal town was made from the settlement by Ottokar II of Bohemia. The town walls were built and between the 13th and 16th centuries were improved. Despite the Hussite Wars and a fire in 1464, which destroyed all the suburbs, the development of the town continued. At the beginning of the 16th century, Klatovy was one of the ten most important towns in the Czech lands.

In the 16th century, Klatovy continued to flourish and many important buildings were built. But the town was damaged several fires, and the Thirty Years' War caused decline. In the mid-17th century, Jesuits came into the town and started not only building development, but also the development of education. However, in a fire in 1689 started by arsonists, all the Gothic and Renaissance monuments burned down.

In the 18th century, Klatovy became the administrative centre of the region. In the early 19th century, part of the fortifications were demolished and the town changed its architectural face. In the second half of the 19th century, Klatovy became the centre of cultural and social life. The development of trade was supported by the construction of new railway and road networks.

During World War II, Klatovy was occupied by Germany. The Germans operated a Gestapo prison in the town. In 1942, Klatovy was the centre of the resistance movement, which was harshly suppressed by the execution of 73 patriots in the Spálený Forest at the time of Reinhard Heydrich. In 1945, some parts of the town were badly damaged by bombing , and the railway station building was completely destroyed. Klatovy was liberated on 5 May 1945 by the US Army. The town's remaining German population was expelled in accordance with the Potsdam Agreement in 1945.

Demographics

Economy
Historically, Klatovy is connected with the textile, leather, wood, engineering and food industries. Currently, the construction, woodworking and metalworking industries predominate. The largest employer in the town is a branch of the Rodenstock GmbH company, which manufactures spectacle lenses here. It has more than 1,000 employers.

Klatovy is famous for growing carnations. Since 1813, a large number of brightly colored varieties have been bred here, which successfully represented Klatovy at many world exhibitions.

Transport

Klatovy is a railway junction. The town has a direct connection with Prague and Plzeň. There are also regional railway lines to Železná Ruda, Domažlice and Horažďovice. The territory of Klatovy is served by five train stations.

Sport
The town's football club SK Klatovy 1898 is one of the oldest football clubs in the country. Nowadays it plays in the fourth tier of the Czech football system.

Klatovy is the starting point of the traditional Král Šumavy ("King of the Bohemian Forest") cycling marathon, which has been held since 1993.

Sights

The oldest part of the town surrounded by fragments of town walls is protected as an urban monument zone since 1992. The best-preserved part of the fortifications is located on the eastern side of the historic town centre, where there are two circular bastions.

One of the main landmarks of Klatovy is the Black Tower, built in 1547–1557 as a watchtower. It turned black after many fires in the history of the town. Nowadays it is open to the public and serves as a lookout tower.

After the Black Tower was finished, construction of the town hall began in 1557. Many construction modifications have completely changed its appearance. The last major reconstruction in the Neo-Renaissance style took place in 1923–1925 based on the project of the architect Josef Fanta. The building still serves its original purpose.

The town museum, officially named Dr. Hostaš Museum of National History in Klatovy, in located in an Art Nouveau house built in 1905–1907.

Baroque Jesuit pharmacy called "At the White Unicorn" on the town square is now a pharmacy museum. The museum maps the history of pharmacy from 1776 until 1966, when the Jesuit pharmacy was abolished. It contains valuable equipment, mostly from the 18th century. Next to the museum is the Gallery At the White Unicorn.

Religious monuments

The Jesuit Church of the Immaculate Conception of the Virgin Mary and of Saint Ignatiusis was built in the early Baroque style in 1655–1679. It was designed by Carlo Lurago and finished by Domenico Orsi. After it was damaged by a fire, it was reconstructed in 1826 to its current appearance. Beneath the church are extensive catacombs where the Jesuits buried members of the order from the 1670s (before the church was finished) until 1783. About 38 mummified bodies have been preserved to this day.

The Dominican monastery with the Church of Saint Lawrence were founded in the 14th century, but they were burned down during the Hussite Wars in 1419. They were renewed after the Thirty Years' War, but were again destroyed by a fire in 1689. The monastery complex was then finally rebuilt in the Baroque style in 1694–1709, but the monastery was abolished in 1786. Today the premises of the former monastery serves social and educational purposes. The church building, owned by the town, was reconstructed in 2000 and is used as an exhibition space.

The Church of the Nativity of the Virgin Mary was built in the Gothic style at the end of the 13th century. Renaissance and baroque modifications were made during the building's history, then it was regotized by Josef Fanta in 1898–1908. Next to the church is a separate bell tower called "White Tower", built in 1581. After a fire in 1758, it was raised and modified to its current form.

Notable people

Bohuslav Balbín (1621–1688), writer, historian, Jesuit
Václav Matěj Kramerius (1753–1808), publisher, journalist and writer
Josef Dobrovský (1753–1829), philologist, historian
Franz Kiwisch von Rotterau (1814–1852), medical professor and gynaecological researcher
Josef Hlávka (1831–1908), architect
August Breisky (1832–1889), medical professor and gynaecological researcher
Johann Brotan (1843–1918), Austrian mechanical engineer
Karel Klostermann (1848–1923), writer
Jaroslav Vrchlický (1853–1912), lyrical poet
Josef Klička (1855–1937), organist, violinist and composer
Lubor Niederle (1865–1944), founder of Czech archaeology
Václav Fišer (born 1947), long jumper and triple jumper
Ivana Sekyrová (born 1971), long-distance runner
Petr Frydrych (born 1988), javelin thrower
Tereza Krejčiříková (born 1996), footballer

Twin towns – sister cities

Klatovy is twinned with:
 Cham, Germany
 Poligny, France

Gallery

References

External links

Art gallery Klatovy / Klenová castle

Cities and towns in the Czech Republic
Populated places in Klatovy District